Boban "Bobi" Mitev (born 7 August 1972) is a Macedonian professional basketball coach.

References

1972 births
Living people
Macedonian expatriate basketball people in Serbia
Macedonian basketball coaches
Sportspeople from Skopje